Raatchasi is a 2019 Indian Tamil-language social drama film, written and directed by Syed Gowthamraj, and produced by S. R. Prakashbabu and S. R. Prabhu under the banner of Dream Warrior Pictures. The film stars Jyothika in the lead role, while Hareesh Peradi, Poornima Bhagyaraj, Sathyan, Nagineedu, and Aruldoss play supporting roles. The music was composed by Sean Roldan with editing by Philomin Raj and cinematography by Gokul Benoy. Upon the film's release on 5 July 2019, it received positive reviews and became a Super Hit.

Plot

The film is about a headmistress (Jyothika) who converts a poorly run school into one of the best in the state. Lieutenant Colonel Geeta Rani is a trainer for new recruits in Indian Army. When she gets to know about a poorly functioning government school, Geeta Rani decides to take up the position of the school's headmistress to improve its state.

Upon arriving at the village, Geeta Rani hears people talking ill about the school, so she gradually makes new positive changes in the school. In this process, she makes a few friends and many enemies, including the local MLA of the village. The majority of the film focuses on how Geeta Rani tries to change the state of the school and makes it one of the best schools in the state.

Cast 

 Jyothika as Lt. Colonel /  Headmistress Geetha Rani a.k.a. Ammu
 Hareesh Peradi as Ramalingam
 Poornima Bhagyaraj as Susheela
 Sathyan as PT Master
 Nagineedu as Geetha Rani's father
 Aruldoss as Politician
 Kavitha Bharathy as Assistant Headmaster
 Vazhakku En Muthuraman as Math Teacher
 Mathew Varghese as Collector
 Master Kamalesh as Kathir
 Sathyajith as Deepak Raj
 Yasar as Politician's son
 Nitish Veera as Ramalingam's nephew
 Akalya Venkatesan
 Rail Ravi

Production 
Raatchasi is the debut movie for the director Syed Gowthamraj. Cinematography is handled by Gokul Benoy, editing by Philomin Raj and music is composed by Sean Roldan. Jyothika is playing the role of headmistress of a Government school.

Release
Initially the producers announced that this movie would be released in June 2019, later they confirmed that the movie will be released on 5 July 2019.

The film was dubbed and released in Hindi as Madam Geeta Rani in 2020 by Goldmines Telefilms and received well on YouTube, garnering over 180 million views within nine months.

Music

The soundtrack, composed by Sean Roldan, released on 20 June 2019 and features 5 songs. The lyrics were penned by Yugabharathi, Thanikodi, Sean Roldan and Sy. Gowthamraj.

Reception

Critical response
 
The film opened to positive reviews from both critics and audiences. Behindwoods gave the film 3.5 out of 5 stars and stated "Jyotika's performance is clean throughout and the clarity she brings to screen is impeccable. She steals the show with good dialogue delivery and body language. The film could have been way better if the story was treated well and the screenplay was more engaging." Sify.com rated the film 3.5 out 5 stars and explained "Raatchasi works mainly because of Jyotika, as her performance is solid and sincere. She is in there in every frame and is in superb form. She has even put on a little weight to look convincing as a teacher. Though it takes some time to sync with her character, slowly she grabs our attention and makes us travel along with her. Watch it for the topical message, sharp dialogues and an earnest Jyotika." Times of India summarised the film by saying "Jyotika's performance as the dutiful teacher is the prime saving grace of this preachy film" and gave the film 3.5 out of 5 stars. Indiaglitz wrote "Sy. Gowthamraj makes a respectable debut armed with genuine knowledge of the issues he has taken up and filming it as honestly as he could. The lack of finesse can be forgiven for the strong content and messages". India Today wrote "Jyothika's Raatchasi is a film that touches upon pressing issues that are plaguing government schools. Along with being predictable, the film lacks a strong screenplay to hold everyone's attention. Raatchasi is a one-time watch". Ananda Vikatan wrote, "Teacher crush, Heroine, special wish for dealt the Educational Development". Film Companion South wrote "When will our directors learn that good intentions cannot make a good movie? Or that relentless music (Sean Roldan is the composer) isn't enough to make us "feel" if there's no emotional connect with the characters?...it's great that Jyotika is cherry-picking projects that indulge in a fair bit of "heroine worship"...but she really needs better scripts".Firstpost rated the film 3.5 out of 5 stars, stating "Raatchasi skims through issues plaguing the education system and offers a one-woman army as the solution".News18 rated it 3.5 out of 5 stars stating "Jyothika makes it bearable". The Hindu stated "Raatchasi is well-intentioned no doubt — films like these are constant reminders of the need to upgrade our government schools - but it needs more finesse, more heart". The Indian Express rated 3 out of 5 stars stating "Raatchasi could have been a better film if the director understood the screenplay and characters were as important as ‘messages'". Hindustan Times rated 2.5 out of 5 stars stating "Despite an earnest effort by actor Jyotika, the film's dependence on melodrama and message-heavy dialogues makes it an effort to watch". Cinema Express rated 3 out of 5 stars stating "After an efficient beginning, Raatchasi settles into a dull, comfortable zone, where familiar demons get addressed, and not particularly in enterprising ways". The News Minute rated 3 out of 5 stars stating "Jyothika's Geetha Rani is a refreshing character but the film does not rise above the predictable one-line story of a teacher turning a school around". Deccan Chronicle rated 3.5 out of 5 stars stating  "Jyothika has given earnest performance, Sean Rolden's music and Gokul Binoy's cinematography capture the right mood of the film".

Publicity

The film's release also had gone viral among Malaysian social media users because of the film's storyline, to the point where the Education Minister of Malaysia, Dr. Maszlee Malik praised the film for its social relevance after watching the film along with his officers. Lead actress Jyothika penned a letter thanking Dr. Mazlee for his support on the film through her husband Suriya Sivakumar's Twitter user account. On September 30, the team of Raatchasi was invited by Dr. Maszlee for a special screening at TGV Setiawalk, Puchong which are also attended by deputy of Education Minister of Malaysia, Teo Nie Ching and other education officers.

Accolades

 2019  –  Behindwoods Gold Medal Award for Best Actor Lead Role (Female)
 2019  –  Edison Award for Best Actress
 2019  – Director SY Gowtham Raj won the JFW award 2020 for the best director in a women-centric film for Raatchasi. Best women-centric film.
 2019  –  JFW Award for Best Actress - Women Centric Film 2020
 2019  –  Nominated - Ananda Vikatan Cinema Award for Best Actress
 2019  –  Screened in Indian film festival of South Korea (October 16 and 20 in Seoul)
 2019  – Zee Tamil Award Nominated for three Category (Favorite Heroine, Best actress and Best Child actor)
 2019  –  Vikatan Cinema Viruthugal - Nominated for five Categories (Actress, Debut Director, Child actor, Dialogue, Best production)
 2019  – Raatchasi Special Screening for Malaysian officials with minister.

References

External links 
 

2019 films
Indian drama films
2010s Tamil-language films
Films scored by Sean Roldan
Films about the education system in India
Films about educators
Films set in schools
2019 directorial debut films
2019 drama films